KBRW may refer to:

 KBRW (AM), a radio station (680 AM) licensed to Barrow, Alaska, United States
 KBRW-FM, a radio station (91.9 FM) licensed to Barrow, Alaska, United States